Georgi Tamazievich Zamtaradze (Russian: Георгий Тамазиевич Замтарадзе; born ) is a Russian male futsal player, playing as a goalkeeper. He is part of the Russia national futsal team. He competed at the UEFA Futsal Euro 2016.

References

1987 births
Living people
Futsal goalkeepers
Russian men's futsal players
Russian people of Georgian descent